Merysha Chandra (born 28 February 1970) is an Indonesian actress, voice actress, singer, model, narrator, and occupation who has been dubbing for foreign productions such as for cartoons, anime and live action films into the Indonesian language. She can dub for young boys, as well as for various aged female roles.

Biography

Voice roles

Dubbing

Television anime
 Doraemon - Shizuka Minamoto (2009-2013) 
 Inazuma Eleven - Additional Voices 
 Ninja Hattori-kun - Kanzo Hattori (Space Toon)
 XX BOM Fighter - Additional Voices

Television animation
 SpongeBob SquarePants - SpongeBob SquarePants (2004-2006),  (Season 1-Season 3), (Lativi) & (2008-2010), (Season 5-Season 6) (Global TV) and Sandy Cheeks (2006), (Season 1) (Global TV)
 The Amazing World of Gumball - Gumball Watterson
 The Penguins of Madagascar - Mort (Global TV)
 Kitty Is Not a Cat - Kitty (Global TV)

Live action films
 Harry Potter - Additional Voices (Aired on HBO dubbed)

References

External links

1970 births
Living people
Indonesian actresses
Indonesian people of Chinese descent
Indonesian women singers
Indonesian voice actresses
Indonesian female models